U.S. Route 319 (US 319) is a spur of US 19.

Route description

Florida

The route starts as a two-lane highway at the eastern end of US 98's bridge over the Apalachicola River near the John Gorrie Bridge in Apalachicola, Florida, and is concurrent with US 98 from its starting point.  After crossing the East Bay portion of Apalachicola Bay via the John Gorrie Bridge, US 319 runs along the Gulf coast of Florida's Panhandle to Carabelle in Franklin County, and departs the coast, and its concurrency with US 98, about halfway between Carrabelle and Bald Point State Park, in a north direction through Sopchoppy in Wakulla County.

In Sopchoppy, the route angles east, briefly meets up with US 98 once more, before parting ways again and running north through Crawfordville, where it receives the FDOT maintenance designation of State Road 369, into Tallahassee in Leon County. US 319 meets SR 61 just south of Tallahassee, marking the northern end of SR 369, where it becomes a 4-lane divided highway, which turns into 6 lanes as the route meets SR 263 and forms part of the southern and eastern portion of the Capital Circle around Tallahassee. US 319 has the unsigned SR 261 designation between State Road 363/Woodville Highway and Capital Circle's eastern terminus at State Road 61/Thomasville Road. US 319/SR 61 has a complex interchange with I-10 at exit 203 before heading northeast out of the Tallahassee area.

Georgia

The route enters Georgia's Grady County co-signed with SR 35, and travels northeast in the direction of Thomasville in Thomas County, where the route forms the western and northern perimeter around Thomasville.  US 319 then continues northeast, passes through Coolidge, and crosses into Colquitt County, running as a bypass around the east of Moultrie.  The route crosses into Tift County and intersects with I-75 just before running through Tifton.

In Ocilla, SR 35 comes to its northern terminus at an intersection with SR 32, which now becomes concurrent with US 319. Past Ocilla, the route, now co-signed with US 129, turns north and heads into Ben Hill County and through Fitzgerald, where it splits from US 129 and first heads east, and then north through the northwestern corner of Coffee County, where it meets up and is co-signed with US 441, and crosses the Ocmulgee River into Telfair County, Georgia at Jacksonville, Georgia and on into  McRae-Helena.  After briefly traversing the western corner of Wheeler County and eastern corner of Dodge County, US 319 continues north through Laurens County, crossing I-16 just before heading into and through Dublin and East Dublin, where US 441 splits off.

Continuing northeast, the route heads into Johnson County, runs through Wrightsville, and heads into southern Jefferson County, where it turns east in Bartow, before meeting its northern terminus at US 1 and SR 4 in Wadley.

US 319 from Tifton to the Florida State Line is a GRIP corridor.

National Highway System
The following portions of US 319 and SR 35 are part of the National Highway System, a system of routes determined to be the most important for the nation's economy, mobility, and defense:
US 319/SR 35:
From its southern terminus in Apalachicola to just north of the concurrency with US 82/SR 520 just east of Tifton
US 319 only:
From the southern end of the SR 32 concurrency in Ocilla to about Fitzgerald
The entire length of the US 441 concurrency, from south of Jacksonville to Dublin.

History

Florida
The entire length of US 319 in Franklin County was designated as "Blue Star Memorial Highway" by the Florida State Legislature in 1957.

The section of US 319 that is co-signed with US 98 and SR 30 in Medart in Wakulla County was designated as "Agnes Morrison Memorial Highway" by the Florida State Legislature in 1961.

Georgia
US 319 does not make an appearance on Georgia road maps until October 1937, when the spur from the Florida state line to Thomasville is shown, co-signed with SR 3.  Prior to October 1937, US 19 appears as the designation of this section of the route.

In July 1941, US 319 was extended from Thomasville, and ran through Moultrie, following what was signed as SR 35 at the time, to Cordele, co-signed with the current route taken by SR 33 from Moultrie.  Since late in 1946, US 319 follows its current route.

The section of US 319 that forms the Thomasville Bypass was designated as "Will Watt Parkway" in 1996 after a prominent resident of Thomasville.

The section of US 319 that forms the east bypass around Moultrie in Colquitt County was designated as "Veterans Parkway" in 2002.

Major intersections

Special routes

Thomasville connector

State Route 35 Connector (SR 35 Conn.) is a  connector route for SR 35 in the northeastern part of the Thomasville area. Its southern terminus is at US 19, US 84, SR 3, SR 38, and SR 300 in the northeastern part of Thomasville. Its northern terminus is at US 319/SR 35 northeast of the city. This highway used to be US 319 Bus./SR 35 Bus. in the city.

Thomasville business loop

State Route 35 Business (SR 35 Bus.) was a business route for SR 35 that served the downtown area of Thomasville. The route was decommissioned in 2007.

Moultrie business loop

U.S. Route 319 Business (US 319 Bus.) is a  business route for US 319 that travels through the central portion of Moultrie. It is concurrent with SR 33 for its entire length.

US 319 Bus. begins at an intersection with US 319/SR 35 (Veterans Parkway) and SR 33 (Pavo Road) in the south-central part of Moultrie. US 319 Bus. and SR 33 travel concurrently as South Main Street to the north-northwest and immediately curve to the north-northeast. An intersection with 32nd Avenue SE leads to Colquitt Regional Medical Center. One block later, an intersection with 31st Avenue leads to the hospital, as well. Just past an intersection with the eastern terminus of Hugh Bannister Drive, they begin a curve back to the north-northwest. Just south of an intersection with the northern terminus of Lower Meigs Road, the highways curve back to the north-northeast. An intersection with 11th Avenue leads to the Jim Buck Goff Recreation Complex. At 4th Avenue, the northbound lanes of US 319 and SR 33 turn right and travel to the east, while the southbound lanes stay on South Main Street. South Main Street remains a two-way street until 2nd Avenue SE. One block later, they turn left onto 1st Street SE and continue their northern direction. On the southeastern corner of the intersection with 2nd Avenue SE lies the main office for Southwest Georgia Bank.

One block later, at 1st Avenue SE, they intersect the eastbound lanes of SR 37. Just north of this intersection, they pass the Colquitt County Courthouse. One block later, they intersect the westbound lanes of SR 37 (East Central Avenue). On the northeastern corner of this intersection lies the annex for the county courthouse. Here, 1st Street SE changes to 1st Street NE. At this same point, South Main Street changes back to a two-way street. At an intersection with 1st Avenue NE, 1st Street NE becomes a two-way street. On the southwestern corner of an intersection with 2nd Avenue NE lies the municipal building. On the northeaster corner lies the annex for the municipal building. Just north of 9th Avenue NE, they travel on a bridge over some railroad tracks of Norfolk Southern Railway (NS). North of Sylvester Drive, they have a roundabout with Sylvester Highway and the southbound lanes of US 319 Bus./SR 33. Just south of this roundabout is a sign for SR 33 south, even though it is actually still on Main Street. In fact, there is a directional sign in the roundabout that says that 1st Street NE is SR 33 south. The reunited lanes travel to the northeast. They cross over Okapilco Creek before they meet their northern terminus, an intersection with US 319/SR 35/SR 133 (Veterans Parkway/Tifton Highway). Here, SR 33 turns left onto East Bypass, concurrent with SR 133.

Between 2nd Avenue NE and 4th Avenue NW, they pass the U.S. post office for the city. Whereas the northbound lanes travel on a bridge over the NS line, the southbound lanes actually meet them at a railroad crossing. Just south of Sylvester Drive, the southbound lanes have an intersection with SR 111 (West Bypass NW). SR 111 does not meet the northbound lanes, or vice versa. Just north of Sylvester Drive, northbound Main Street has signage that indicates that it is northbound US 319 Bus./SR 33, although they are actually on 1st Street NE.

The entire length of US 319 Bus., and the portion of SR 33 concurrent with it, is part of the National Highway System, a system of routes determined to be the most important for the nation's economy, mobility, and defense.

Tifton loop route

State Route 35 Loop (SR 35 Loop) is a  loop route for SR 35 that exists on the southwestern edge of the city limits of Tifton. It actually functions more like a connector, since it connects US 319/SR 35 to Interstate 75 (I-75). This interchange with I-75 is on the Tifton–Phillipsburg line. SR 35 Loop is known as Old Omega Road for its entire length.

Gallery

See also

References

External links

 Endpoints of U.S. Highway 319

19-3
19-3
19-3
3
Roads in Franklin County, Florida
Roads in Wakulla County, Florida
Roads in Leon County, Florida
Transportation in Grady County, Georgia
Transportation in Thomas County, Georgia
Transportation in Colquitt County, Georgia
Transportation in Tift County, Georgia
Transportation in Irwin County, Georgia
Transportation in Ben Hill County, Georgia
Transportation in Coffee County, Georgia
Transportation in Telfair County, Georgia
Transportation in Wheeler County, Georgia
Transportation in Laurens County, Georgia
Transportation in Johnson County, Georgia
Transportation in Jefferson County, Georgia